This is a list of players, past and present, who have been capped by their country in international football whilst playing for Jeunesse Sportive de Kabylie. a further 5 nations have fielded JS Kabylie players in their international sides. The number of JS Kabylie players who participated in the African Cup of Nations is 30 more than any other Algerian club, the first was in 1980 goalkeeper Mehdi Cerbah, Salah Larbès and Captain Ali Fergani. As for the first participation of Algeria in the FIFA World Cup in 1982, three players were present Salah Larbès, Ali Fergani and Mourad Amara. At the 1990 Africa Cup of Nations in Algeria, the national team won the title for the first time In a squad that included seven JS Kabylie players they are Larbi El Hadi, Rachid Adghigh, Messaoud Aït Abderrahmane, Mahieddine Meftah, Moussa Saïb, Nacer Bouiche and Abderrazak Djahnit.

Players

Algerien players

Foreign players

Players in international competitions

African Cup Players
  
 
 
1980 African Cup
  Mehdi Cerbah
  Ali Fergani
  Salah Larbès

1982 African Cup
  Mourad Amara
  Salah Larbès
  Ali Fergani

1984 African Cup
  Abdelhamid Sadmi
  Ali Fergani
  Djamel Menad

1986 African Cup
  Abdelhamid Sadmi
  Ali Fergani
  Nacer Bouiche
  Djamel Menad

1988 African Cup
  Hakim Medane

1990 African Cup
  Larbi El Hadi
  Rachid Adghigh
  Messaoud Aït Abderrahmane
  Mahieddine Meftah
  Moussa Saïb
  Nacer Bouiche
  Abderrazak Djahnit

1992 African Cup
  Mourad Rahmouni
  Mahieddine Meftah
  Moussa Saïb

1996 African Cup
  Aomar Hamened
  Mahieddine Meftah
  Rezki Amrouche

1998 African Cup
  Abdelazziz Benhamlat
  Sid Ahmed Mahrez

2000 African Cup
  Abdelazziz Benhamlat
  Fawzi Moussouni
  Lamine Boughrara

2002 African Cup
  Lounès Gaouaoui
  Brahim Zafour
  Lounès Bendahmane
  Slimane Rahou

2004 African Cup
  Lounès Gaouaoui
  Brahim Zafour
  Slimane Raho

2013 African Cup
  Essaïd Belkalem
  Ali Rial

2015 African Cup
  Azzedine Doukha

2017 African Cup
  Malik Asselah

World Cup Players

 
World Cup 1982
  Ali Fergani
  Salah Larbes
  Mourad Amara

 
World Cup 1986
  Abdelhamid Sadmi
  Djamel Menad
  Mourad Amara

Olympic Players

 
1980 Summer Olympics
  Mourad Amara
  Ali Fergani
  Salah Larbès

 
2016 Summer Olympics
  Houari Ferhani

External links
FIFA.com
DzFoot
web.archive.org
National Football Teams

References

JS Kabylie
 
JS Kabylie international
Association football player non-biographical articles
Lists of international association football players by club